The 2006 MLB Japan All-Star Series was the tenth edition of the championship, a best-of-five series between the All-Star teams from Major League Baseball (MLB) and Nippon Professional Baseball (NPB). After the 2006 championship, the series became defunct.

MLB won the series by 5–0–0 and Ryan Howard was named MVP.

Results
Championship

Rosters

MLB All-Stars roster

NPB All-Stars roster

References

External links

2006 in Japanese sport
2006 in baseball
MLB Japan All-Star Series